The 1947–48 season was the 48th season in the history of Berner Sport Club Young Boys. The team played their home games at Stadion Wankdorf in Bern. This was their first season in the second division after being relegated from the top flight.

Players
 Weiss
 Flühmann
 Zehnder
 C. Casali
 Stoll
 Bigler
 Giacometti
 H. Grütter
 Rossetti
 Weil
 Zaugg

Friendlies

Competitions

Overall record

Nationalliga B

League table

Matches

Swiss Cup

References

BSC Young Boys seasons
Swiss football clubs 1947–48 season